This article lists census-designated places (CDPs) in the U.S. state of Arkansas. As of 2017, there were a total of 39 census-designated places in Arkansas.

Census-Designated Places

References

See also
List of cities and towns in Arkansas
List of places in Arkansas

 
Census-designated places
Arkansas